John Little (11 February 1927 – 28 September 2004) was a New Zealand cricketer. He played in two first-class matches for Wellington in 1947/48.

See also
 List of Wellington representative cricketers

References

External links
 

1927 births
2004 deaths
New Zealand cricketers
Wellington cricketers
Cricketers from Wellington City